The Amos Kling House is a historic house located in Daytona Beach, Florida. It is locally significant for its association with the development of the resort community of Daytona Beach during the early 20th century.

Description 
Constructed in 1907, the -story house has an irregular floor-plan. The frame structural system is finished on all elevations with weatherboard siding and wood shingles. It rests on a brick pier foundation with lattice infill. The cross-gable roof is sheathed with asphalt shingles. The vernacular residence is enlivened by features associated with the Shingle Style. It was the summer home of Amos Kling, the father-in-law of U.S. President Warren Harding. Currently a restaurant, the Cellar, occupies the first floor.

It was added to the National Register of Historic Places on December 2, 1993.

References

External links
 Volusia County listings at National Register of Historic Places
 Florida's Office of Cultural and Historical Programs
 Volusia County listings
 Amos Kling House

Houses on the National Register of Historic Places in Volusia County, Florida
Vernacular architecture in Florida
Buildings and structures in Daytona Beach, Florida
Houses completed in 1907
Shingle Style houses
Shingle Style architecture in Florida